Kern Valley High School is a small high school located in Lake Isabella, California, and is one of the comprehensive high schools in the Kern High School District. The school has a staff of approximately 70 teachers and support staff, and a student population of about 468.

History
Before a school was built in the Kern River Valley, students were bussed to Bakersfield where they stayed in dormitories during the week, and returned home on the week-ends. Kernville High School opened its doors to 20 students in 1941. In 1951 when the Lake Isabella Dam was constructed and the resulting reservoir would have covered the school, it was moved to the town of Lake Isabella and renamed Kern Valley High School. As the student population continued to grow, additional classrooms and a gymnasium were constructed. A new school cafeteria was added, an industrial arts complex was constructed, and permanent "portable" classrooms were installed. The school was named a California Distinguished school in 2006–2007 school year.

Elective classes
Kern Valley High School offers a number of elective classes in addition to the normal required curriculum. They offer classes such as:
Beginning and Intermediate Choir
Beginning and Intermediate Band
Yearbook
Home Economics
Foods Lab
Floral
several Agricultural classes

References

External links
 Kern Valley High School web page

High schools in Kern County, California
Public high schools in California
1941 establishments in California